Layering in linguistics refers to one of the five principles by which grammaticalisation can be detected while it is taking place. The others are divergence, specialisation, persistence, and de-categorialisation.

Layering refers to the phenomenon that a language can have and develop multiple expressions for the same function, that language, in the "lexical" as well as in the "grammatical" domain, tolerates and permanently creates multiple synonymy. "Within a broad functional domain, new layers are continually emerging. As this happens, the older layers are not necessarily discarded, but may remain to coexist with and interact with the newer layers."

During the process of grammaticalisation, new layers are added to older ones whereby the functional domain is broadened: several items may fulfil the same linguistic function.

An example from English: 'I am going to study' / 'I will study' / 'I shall study'.

References 

 Lessau, Donald A. A Dictionary of Grammaticalization. Bochum: Brockmeyer, 1994. 
 Hopper, Paul J. “On some principles of grammaticization”. In Elizabeth Closs Traugott and Bernd Heine, eds. Approaches to Grammaticalization, Vol. I. Amsterdam: John Benjamins, 1991. pp. 17–36.

Historical linguistics